Llanberis railway station was located in Llanberis, Gwynedd, Wales. It was a short walk from the Llanberis station of the Snowdon Mountain Railway. It opened 1 July 1869, and closed for regular passenger services in 1930. But it was still used by summer excursion trains until 7 September 1962 and freight services until 3 September 1964.

The last fare-paying passenger service was an enthusiasts' special on 20 October 1964.

An engine shed stood between the goods yard and the 42' turntable beyond the end of the platform.  From 1948 to 1962 some excursion trains used an observation car which was turned round on the turntable so occupants always had an open view. The shed closed around 1915 and had been demolished by 1919. The goods yard was the last part of the working railway to close.

The station had a ticket platform at its northern end. A LMS caravan was sited opposite from 1934 to 1939. A camping coach was also positioned here by the London Midland Region from 1954 to 1959 (two coaches in 1954 only).

The line was lifted in 1965. In 2015 the original station building was in use as a craft shop.

References

Sources

Further reading

External links 
 
 
 
 
 
 
 
 
 
 
 
 
 

Former London and North Western Railway stations
Railway stations in Great Britain opened in 1869
Railway stations in Great Britain closed in 1962
Disused railway stations in Gwynedd
Llanberis